SuperHeavy is the only album by the rock supergroup SuperHeavy. It was released on 16 September 2011 by A&M Records.

Background and recording
The SuperHeavy project began in 2009. In early 2009, Mick Jagger, Dave Stewart, Joss Stone, Damian Marley and A. R. Rahman experimented at a studio in Los Angeles, trying to "write songs which had meaning". They had a couple more sessions after that trying to perfect every song that was written. Jagger stated in an interview that "they had entered with just ideas, a few guitar riffs and a few snippets of lyrics... which isn't his usual style of working, but music evolved quickly."

The majority of the album was recorded at Jim Henson Studios in Los Angeles, with parts recorded off the coasts of Greece and Turkey on the Octopus, a megayacht owned by Microsoft co-founder Paul Allen. The band recorded 29 songs in 10 days. Some of the songs recorded were even an hour long. In total, there was more than 35 hours of music recorded, from which Stewart and his engineer found the highlights that would work as the roots of songs. However, the standard version of the album only included 12 songs.

Release and promotion
The band gathered at Jim Henson Studios in Los Angeles on 30 June 2011 to preview the album. The preview began with a short documentary showing SuperHeavy recording at the studio. The group played eight of the recorded songs at the event.

Singles
"Miracle Worker" was released as the album's lead single on 7 July 2011. It is a reggae song performed by Marley, Stone and Jagger. The single peaked at number 136 on the UK Singles Chart. The music video was released on YouTube on 12 August 2011. Directed by Stewart and filmed at Paramount Studios in Los Angeles, the video features all five members of the band.

"Satyameva Jayathe" (named after the national motto of India, which literally translates to "Truth Alone Triumphs") was released as the second single from the album on 9 August 2011, a week before India's Independence Day on 15 August. Composed by Rahman to have an Indian feel, Jagger sings in Sanskrit on the song, which also features Stewart, Stone and Marley. The song premiered exclusively on Radio Mirchi 98.3 FM on 9 August across 22 Indian cities, and Tata DoCoMo was set to simultaneously promote the song and the album on mass media.

"Beautiful People" reached number 64 on the Dutch Single Top 100 chart.

Track listing

Charts

Weekly charts

Year-end charts

Release history

Notes

References

2011 debut albums
A&M Records albums
Albums produced by David A. Stewart
Albums produced by Mick Jagger
Polydor Records albums
SuperHeavy albums
Universal Republic Records albums